The 1796 United States elections elected the members of the 5th United States Congress. The election took place during the beginning stages of the First Party System, as the Federalist Party and the Democratic-Republican Party clashed over the states' rights, the financial policies of Treasury Secretary Alexander Hamilton, and the recently ratified Jay Treaty. The Federalists maintained control of the Senate, and won control of the House and the presidency.

In the first contested Presidential election and the first presidential election in which parties played a major role, Federalist Vice President John Adams narrowly defeated Democratic-Republican former Secretary of State Thomas Jefferson. Adams won New England while Jefferson won the South, leaving the mid-Atlantic states to decide the election. As the election took place prior to the ratification of the 12th Amendment, Jefferson, who finished with the second most electoral votes, succeeded Adams as vice president. Federalist former Governor Thomas Pinckney of South Carolina finished with the third most electoral votes, while Democratic-Republican Senator Aaron Burr of New York finished in fourth place. This election marked the only time in American history that members of two different political parties were elected as president and vice president. Adams's election made him the first member of a political party to be elected president, as George Washington had remained unaffiliated with any political faction or party throughout his presidency.

In the House, Federalists won moderate gains, taking majority control of the chamber.

In the Senate, Federalists picked up one seat, maintaining a commanding majority in the chamber.

See also
1796 United States presidential election
1796–97 United States House of Representatives elections
1796–97 United States Senate elections

References

1796 elections in the United States
1796